Underfloor heating and cooling is a form of central heating and cooling that achieves indoor climate control for thermal comfort using hydronic or electrical heating elements embedded in a floor. Heating is achieved by conduction, radiation and convection. Use of underfloor heating dates back to the Neoglacial and Neolithic periods.

History
Underfloor heating has a long history back into the Neoglacial and Neolithic periods. Archeological digs in Asia and the Aleutian islands of Alaska reveal how the inhabitants drafted smoke from fires through stone covered trenches which were excavated in the floors of their subterranean dwellings. The hot smoke heated the floor stones and the heat then radiated into the living spaces. These early forms have evolved into modern systems using fluid filled pipes or electrical cables and mats. Below is a chronological overview of under floor heating from around the world.

Description
Modern underfloor heating systems use either electrical resistance elements ("electric systems") or fluid flowing in pipes ("hydronic systems") to heat the floor. Either type can be installed as the primary, whole-building heating system or as localized floor heating for thermal comfort. Some systems allow for single rooms to be heated when they are a part of a larger multi-room system, avoiding any wasted heat. Electrical resistance can only be used for heating; when space cooling is also required, hydronic systems must be used. Other applications for which either electric or hydronic systems are suited include snow/ice melting for walks, driveways and landing pads, turf conditioning of football and soccer fields and frost prevention in freezers and skating rinks. A range of underfloor heating systems and designs are available to suit different types of flooring.

Electric heating elements or hydronic piping can be cast in a concrete floor slab ("poured floor system" or "wet system"). They can also be placed under the floor covering ("dry system") or attached directly to a wood sub floor ("sub floor system" or "dry system").

Some commercial buildings are designed to take advantage of thermal mass which is heated or cooled during off-peak hours when utility rates are lower. With the heating/cooling system turned off during the day, the concrete mass and room temperature drift up or down within the desired comfort range. Such systems are known as thermally activated building systems or TABS.

The terms radiant heating and radiant cooling are commonly used to describe this approach because radiation is responsible for a significant portion of the resulting thermal comfort but this usage is technically correct only when radiation composes more than 50% of the heat exchange between the floor and the rest of the space.

Hydronic systems 
Hydronic systems use water or a mix of water and anti-freeze such as propylene glycol as the heat transfer fluid in a "closed-loop" that is recirculated between the floor and the boiler.

Various types of pipes are available specifically for hydronic underfloor heating and cooling systems and are generally made from polyethylene including PEX, PEX-Al-PEX and PERT. Older materials such as Polybutylene (PB) and copper or steel pipe are still used in some locales or for specialized applications.

Hydronic systems require skilled designers and tradespeople familiar with boilers, circulators, controls, fluid pressures and temperature. The use of modern factory assembled sub-stations, used primarily in district heating and cooling, can greatly simplify design requirements and reduce the installation and commissioning time of hydronic systems.

Hydronic systems can use a single source or combination of energy sources to help manage energy costs. Hydronic system energy source options are:
Boilers (heaters) including Combined heat and power plants heated by:
Natural gas or "methane" industry-wide is considered the cleanest and most efficient method of heating water, depending on availability. Costs about $7/million b.t.u.
Propane mainly made from oil, less efficient than natural gas by volume, and generally much more expensive on a b.t.u. basis. Produces more carbon dioxide than "methane" on a b.t.u. basis. Costs about $25/million b.t.u.
Coal, oil, or waste oil
Electricity
Solar thermal
Wood or other biomass
Bio-fuels
Heat pumps and chillers powered by:
Electricity
Natural gas
Geothermal heat pump

Electric systems 
Electric systems are used only for heating and employ non-corrosive, flexible heating elements including cables, pre-formed cable mats, bronze mesh, and carbon films. Due to their low profile, they can be installed in a thermal mass or directly under floor finishes. Electric systems can also take advantage of time-of-use electricity metering and are frequently used as carpet heaters, portable under area rug heaters, under laminate floor heaters, under tile heating, under wood floor heating, and floor warming systems, including under shower floor and seat heating. Large electric systems also require skilled designers and tradespeople but this is less so for small floor warming systems. Electric systems use fewer components and are simpler to install and commission than hydronic systems. Some electric systems use line voltage technology while others use low voltage technology. The power consumption of an electric system is not based on voltage but rather wattage output produced by the heating element.

Features

Airflow from vertical temperature gradients

Thermal comfort quality
As defined by ANSI/ASHRAE Standard 55 – Thermal Environmental Conditions for Human Occupancy, thermal comfort is, "that condition of mind which expresses satisfaction with the thermal environment and is assessed by subjective evaluation." Relating specifically to underfloor heating, thermal comfort is influenced by floor surface temperature and associated elements such as radiant asymmetry, mean radiant temperature, and operative temperature. Research by Nevins, Rohles, Gagge, P. Ole Fanger et al. show that humans at rest with clothing typical of light office and home wear, exchange over 50% of their sensible heat via radiation.

Underfloor heating influences the radiant exchange by warming the interior surfaces. The heating of the surfaces suppresses body heat loss resulting in a perception of heating comfort. This general sensation of comfort is further enhanced through conduction (feet on floor) and through convection by the surface's influence on air density. Underfloor cooling works by absorbing both short wave and long wave radiation resulting in cool interior surfaces. These cool surfaces encourage the loss of body heat resulting in a perception of cooling comfort. Localized discomfort due to cold and warm floors wearing normal footwear and stocking feet is addressed in the ISO 7730 and ASHRAE 55 standards and ASHRAE Fundamentals Handbooks and can be corrected or regulated with floor heating and cooling systems.

Indoor air quality
Underfloor heating can have a positive effect on the quality of indoor air by facilitating the choice of otherwise perceived cold flooring materials such as tile, slate, terrazzo, and concrete. These masonry surfaces typically have very low VOC emissions (volatile organic compounds) in comparison to other flooring options. In conjunction with moisture control, floor heating also establishes temperature conditions that are less favorable in supporting mold, bacteria, viruses and dust mites. By removing the sensible heating load from the total HVAC (Heating, Ventilating, and Air Conditioning) load, ventilation, filtration and dehumidification of incoming air can be accomplished with dedicated outdoor air systems having less volumetric turnover to mitigate distribution of airborne contaminates. There is recognition from the medical community relating to the benefits of floor heating especially as it relates to allergens.

Energy
Under floor radiant systems are evaluated for sustainability through the principles of efficiency, entropy, exergy and efficacy. When combined with high-performance buildings, underfloor systems operate with low temperatures in heating and high temperatures in cooling in the ranges found typically in geothermal and solar thermal systems. When coupled with these non-combustible, renewable energy sources the sustainability benefits include reduction or elimination of combustion and greenhouse gases produced by boilers and power generation for heat pumps and chillers, as well as reduced demands for non-renewables and greater inventories for future generations. This has been supported through simulation evaluations and through research funded by the U.S. Department of Energy, Canada Mortgage and Housing Corporation, Fraunhofer Institute ISE as well as ASHRAE.

Safety and health
Low-temperature underfloor heating is embedded in the floor or placed under the floor covering. As such it occupies no wall space and creates no burn hazards, nor is it a hazard for physical injuries due to accidental contact leading to tripping and falling. This has been referenced as a positive feature in healthcare facilities including those serving elderly clients and those with dementia. Anecdotally, under similar environmental conditions, heated floors will speed evaporation of wetted floors (showering, cleaning, and spills). Additionally, underfloor heating with fluid-filled pipes is useful in heating and cooling explosion-proof environments where combustion and electrical equipment can be located remotely from the explosive environment.

There is a likelihood that underfloor heating may add to offgassing and sick building syndrome in an environment, particularly when the carpet is used as flooring.

Electric underfloor heating systems cause low frequency magnetic fields (in the 50–60 Hz range), old 1-wire systems much more so than modern 2-wire systems. The International Agency for Research on Cancer (IARC) has classified static and low-frequency magnetic fields as possibly carcinogenic (Group 2B).

Longevity, maintenance and repair
Equipment maintenance and repair is the same as for other water or electrical based HVAC systems except when pipes, cables or mats are embedded in the floor. Early trials (for example homes built by Levitt and Eichler, c. 1940–1970s) experienced failures in embedded copper and steel piping systems as well as failures assigned by the courts to Shell, Goodyear and others for polybutylene and EPDM materials. There also have been a few publicized claims of failed electric heated gypsum panels from the mid-1990s.

Failures associated with most installations are attributable to job site neglect, installation errors, and product mishandling such as exposure to ultraviolet radiation. Pre-pour pressure tests required by concrete installation standards and good practice guidelines for the design, construction, operation and repair of radiant heating and cooling systems mitigate problems resulting from improper installation and operation.

Fluid based systems using cross-linked polyethylene (PEX) a product developed in the 1930s and its various derivatives such as PE-rt have demonstrated reliable long term performance in harsh cold-climate applications such as bridge decks, aircraft hangar aprons, and landing pads. PEX has become a popular and reliable option in-home use for new concrete slab construction, and new underfloor joist construction as well as (joist) retrofit. Since the materials are produced from polyethylene and its bonds are cross-linked, it is highly resistant to corrosion or the temperature and pressure stresses associated with typical fluid-based HVAC systems. For PEX reliability, installation procedures must be precise (especially at joints) and manufacturers specifications for a maximum temperature of water or fluid, etc. must be carefully followed.

Design and installation

The engineering of underfloor cooling and heating systems is governed by industry standards and guidelines.

Technical design
The amount of heat exchanged from or to an underfloor system is based on the combined radiant and convective heat transfer coefficients.
Radiant heat transfer is constant based on the Stefan–Boltzmann constant.
Convective heat transfer changes over time depending on
the air's density and thus its buoyancy. Air buoyancy changes according to surface temperatures and
forced air movement due to fans and the motion of people and objects in the space.
Convective heat transfer with underfloor systems is much greater when the system is operating in a heating rather than cooling mode. Typically with underfloor heating the convective component is almost 50% of the total heat transfer and in underfloor cooling the convective component is less than 10%.

Heat and moisture considerations
When heated and cooled pipes or heating cables share the same spaces as other building components, parasitic heat transfer can occur between refrigeration appliances, cold storage areas, domestic cold water lines, air conditioning and ventilation ducts. To control this, the pipes, cables and other building components must all be well insulated.

With underfloor cooling, condensation may collect on the surface of the floor. To prevent this, air humidity is kept low, below 50%, and floor temperatures are maintained above the dew point,  (66F).

Building systems and materials
Heat losses to below grade
The thermal conductivity of soil will influence the conductive heat transfer between the ground and heated or cooled slab-on-grade floors.
Soils with moisture contents greater than 20% can be as much as 15 times more conductive than soils with less than 4% moisture content.
Water tables and general soil conditions should be evaluated.
Suitable underslab insulation such as rigid extruded or expanded polystyrene is required by Model National Energy Codes.
Heat losses at the exterior floor framing
The heated or cooled sub-floor increases the temperature difference between the outdoors and the conditioned floor.
The cavities created by the framing timbers such as headers, trimmers and cantilevered sections must then be insulated with rigid, batt or spray type insulations of suitable value based on climate and building techniques.
Masonry and other hard flooring considerations
Concrete floors must accommodate shrinkage and expansion due to curing and changes in temperature.
Curing times and temperatures for poured floors (concrete, lightweight toppings) must follow industry standards.
Control and expansion joints and crack suppression techniques are required for all masonry type floors including;
Tile
Slate
Terrazzo
Stone
Marble
Concrete, stained, textured and stamped
Wood flooring
The dimensional stability of wood is based primary on moisture content, however, other factors can mitigate the changes to wood as it is heated or cooled, including;
Wood species
Milling techniques, quarter sawn or plane sawn
Acclimation period
Relative humidity within the space
Piping standards

Control system 

Underfloor heating and cooling systems can have several control points including the management of:
Fluid temperatures in the heating and cooling plant (e.g. boilers, chillers, heat pumps).
Influences the efficiency
Fluid temperatures in distribution network between the plant and the radiant manifolds.
Influences the capital and operating costs
Fluid temperatures in the PE-x piping systems, which is based on;
Heating and cooling demands
Tube spacing
Upward and downward losses
Flooring characteristics
Operative temperature
Incorporates the mean radiant and dry bulb
Surface temperatures for;
Comfort
Health and safety
Material integrity
Dew point (for floor cooling).

Mechanical schematic

Illustrated is a simplified mechanical schematic of an underfloor heating and cooling system for thermal comfort quality with a separate air handling system for indoor air quality. In high performance residential homes of moderate size (e.g. under 3000 ft2 (278 m2) total conditioned floor area), this system using manufactured hydronic control appliances would take up about the same space as a three or four piece bathroom.

Modeling piping patterns with finite element analysis
Modeling radiant piping (also tube or loop) patterns with finite element analysis (FEA) predicts the thermal diffusions and surface temperature quality or efficacy of various loop layouts. The performance of the model (left image below) and image to the right are useful to gain an understanding in relationships between flooring resistances, conductivities of surrounding mass, tube spacings, depths and fluid temperatures. As with all FEA simulations, they depict a snap shot in time for a specific assembly and may not be representative of all floor assemblies nor for system that have been operative for considerable time in a steady state condition. The practical application of FEA for the engineer is being able to assess each design for fluid temperature, back losses and surface temperature quality. Through several iterations it is possible to optimize the design for the lowest fluid temperature in heating and the highest fluid temperature in cooling which enables combustion and compression equipment to achieve its maximum rated efficiency performance.

Economics
There is a wide range of pricing for underfloor systems based on regional differences, materials, application and project complexity. It is widely adopted in the Nordic, Asian and European communities. Consequently, the market is more mature and systems relatively more affordable than less developed markets such as North America where market share for fluid based systems remains between 3% to 7% of HVAC systems (ref. Statistics Canada and United States Census Bureau).

In energy efficiency buildings such as Passive House, R-2000 or Net Zero Energy, simple thermostatic radiator valves can be installed along with a single compact circulator and small condensing heater controlled without or with basic hot water reset control. Economical electric resistance based systems also are useful in small zones such as bathrooms and kitchens, but also for entire buildings where heating loads are very low. Larger structures will need more sophisticated systems to deal with cooling and heating needs, and often require building management control systems to regulate the energy use and control the overall indoor environment.

Low temperature radiant heating and high temperature radiant cooling systems lend themselves well to district energy systems (community based systems) due to the temperature differentials between the plant and the buildings which allow small diameter insulated distribution networks and low pumping power requirements. The low return temperatures in heating and high return temperatures in cooling enable the district energy plant to achieve maximum efficiency. The principles behind district energy with underfloor systems can also be applied to stand alone multi story buildings with the same benefits. Additionally, underfloor radiant systems are ideally suited to renewable energy sources including geothermal and solar thermal systems or any system where waste heat is recoverable.

In the global drive for sustainability, long term economics supports the need to eliminate where possible, compression for cooling and combustion for heating.

System efficiency
System efficiency and energy use analysis takes into account building enclosure performance, efficiency of the heating and cooling plant, system controls and the conductivities, surface characteristics, tube/element spacing and depth of the radiant panel, operating fluid temperatures and wire to water efficiency of the circulators. The efficiency in electric systems is analyzed by similar processes and includes the efficiency of electricity generation.

Though the efficiency of radiant systems is under constant debate with no shortage of anecdotal claims and scientific papers presenting both sides, the low return fluid temperatures in heating and high return fluid temperatures in cooling enable condensing boilers, chillers and heat pumps to operate at or near their maximum engineered performance. The greater efficiency of 'wire to water' versus 'wire to air' flow due to water's significantly greater heat capacity favors fluid based systems over air based systems. Both field application and simulation research have demonstrated significant electrical energy savings with radiant cooling and dedicated outdoor air systems based in part on the previous noted principles.

In Passive Houses, R-2000 homes or Net Zero Energy buildings the low temperatures of radiant heating and cooling systems present significant opportunities to exploit exergy.

Efficiency considerations for flooring surface materials
System efficiency is also affected by the floor covering serving as the radiational boundary layer between the floor mass and occupants and other contents of the conditioned space. For example, carpeting has a greater resistance or lower conductance than tile. Thus carpeted floors need to operate at higher internal temperatures than tile which can create lower efficiencies for boilers and heat pumps. However, when the floor covering is known at the time the system is installed, then the internal floor temperature required for a given covering can be achieved through proper tube spacing without sacrificing plant efficiency (though the higher internal floor temperatures may result in increased heat loss from the non-room surfaces of the floor).

The emissivity, reflectivity and absorptivity of a floor surface are critical determinants of its heat exchange with the occupants and room. Unpolished flooring surface materials and treatments have very high emissivity's (0.85 to 0.95) and therefore make good heat radiators.

With underfloor heating and cooling ("reversible floors") flooring surfaces with high absorbance and emissivity and low reflectivity are most desirable.

Thermographic evaluation

Thermography is a useful tool to see the actual thermal efficacy of an underfloor system from its start up (as shown) to its operating conditions. In a startup it is easy to identify the tube location but less so as the system moves into a steady state condition. It is important to interpret thermographic images correctly. As is the case with finite element analysis (FEA), what is seen, reflects the conditions at the time of the image and may not represent the steady conditions. For example, the surfaces viewed in the images shown, may appear ‘hot’, but in reality are actually below the nominal temperature of the skin and core temperatures of the human body and the ability to ‘see’ the pipes does not equate to ‘feel’ the pipes. Thermography can also point out flaws in the building enclosures (left image, corner intersection detail), thermal bridging (right image, studs) and the heat losses associated with exterior doors (center image).

Global examples of large modern buildings using radiant heating and cooling
 41 Cooper Square, United States
 Akron Art Museum, United States
 BMW Welt, Germany
 California Academy of Science, United States
 Copenhagen Opera House, Denmark
 Ewha Womans University, South Korea
 Hearst Tower, New York City, United States
 Manitoba Hydro Place, Canada
 National Renewable Energy Laboratory Research Support Facility, United States
 Pearl River Tower, China
 Post Tower, Germany
 Suvarnabhumi Airport, Bangkok

See also

American Society of Heating, Refrigerating and Air-Conditioning Engineers
Electric heating
Hydronics
Gloria (heating system)
Heater (types of heaters)
Hypocaust
Kang bed-stove
Psychrometrics
Ondol
Renewable heat
Underfloor air distribution

References

Notes

Residential heating
Heating, ventilation, and air conditioning
Ancient inventions